Shekkacho (also Mocha, Shakacho, Shekka) is an Afro-Asiatic Omotic language, spoken mainly in Sheka Zone at southwestern Ethiopia.  It is closely related to Kafa.

Notes

Bibliography
Leslau, Wolf. 1958. “Moča, A Tone Language of The Kafa Group in South-Western Ethiopia.” Africa 28: 135-147.
Leslau, Wolf. 1959. A Dictionary of Moča (South-Western Ethiopia). Los Angeles: University of California Press.

External links
 World Atlas of Language Structures information on Moca

Languages of Ethiopia
North Omotic languages